Jorrick Raydell Calvin (born July 17, 1987) is a former American football cornerback. He was drafted by the Arizona Cardinals in the sixth round of the 2010 NFL Draft. He played college football at Troy.

He has also been a member of the Philadelphia Eagles, New Orleans VooDoo, Chicago Rush, and Los Angeles Kiss.

College career
Calvin played college football at Troy University from 2008 to 2009, to which he had transferred from East Central Community College.

Professional career

Arizona Cardinals
Calvin was selected by the Arizona Cardinals in the sixth round (201st overall) of the 2010 NFL Draft.

Philadelphia Eagles
Calvin was traded to the Philadelphia Eagles on August 30, 2010, in exchange for fullback Charles Scott, who was selected one pick before Calvin in the 2010 NFL Draft.

Calvin became the starting kickoff returner for the Eagles after Ellis Hobbs suffered an injury early in the season. Hobbs regained the starting job after Calvin fumbled the ball on a return, but after Hobbs was placed on injured reserve with a neck injury, Calvin took back the job for the November 28 game against the Chicago Bears.

On December 12, 2010, Calvin fielded a kickoff from Dallas Cowboys kicker David Buehler in the Eagles' own end zone. Calvin then jogged around the end zone without crossing the goal line and introducing the ball into the field of play, or "downing" the ball and ending the play with a touchback. Head coach Andy Reid said Calvin was told to run around because the Cowboys' kickoff team was so used to Buehler kicking touchbacks that they typically did not complete the coverage. Immediately following, Calvin was involved in an on-field altercation with Cowboys cornerback Alan Ball, resulting in an unnecessary roughness penalty for Calvin. Calvin was placed on injured reserve on December 23 after suffering a back injury in a week 15 game against the New York Giants.

Calvin was waived by the Eagles on September 1, 2011.

Los Angeles Kiss
Calvin was assigned to the Los Angeles Kiss on December 23, 2013. He was reassigned on March 8, 2014, but appeared in the first episode of 4th and Loud on AMC.

Chicago Blitz
On February 10, 2016, Calvin signed with the Chicago Blitz.

Kansas City Phantoms
Calvin signed with the Kansas City Phantoms in 2017. He was released on February 28, 2017.

References

External links

Philadelphia Eagles bio 
Arizona Cardinals bio 
Troy Trojans bio 

1987 births
Living people
Players of American football from Baton Rouge, Louisiana
American football cornerbacks
American football return specialists
Troy Trojans football players
East Central Warriors football players
Arizona Cardinals players
Philadelphia Eagles players
New Orleans VooDoo players
Chicago Rush players
Los Angeles Kiss players
Chicago Blitz (indoor football) players
Kansas City Phantoms players